Slabodka yeshiva may refer to:

 Hebron Yeshiva, a branch of the Slabodka Yeshiva in Hebron, relocated afterward to Jerusalem
 Slabodka yeshiva (Bnei Brak), a branch of the Slabodka yeshiva in Bnei Brak
 Yeshivas Knesses Yisrael (Slabodka), the original Slabodka yeshiva, located in Slabodka (Vilijampolė), Lithuania

ru:Иешива «Слободка»
yi:סלאבאדקער ישיבה